Osemozotan (MKC-242) is a selective 5-HT1A receptor agonist with some functional selectivity, acting as a full agonist at presynaptic and a partial agonist at postsynaptic 5-HT1A receptors. 5-HT1A receptor stimulation influences the release of various neurotransmitters including serotonin, dopamine, norepinephrine, and acetylcholine. 5-HT1A receptors are inhibitory G protein-coupled receptor.  Osemozotan has antidepressant, anxiolytic, antiobsessional, serenic, and analgesic effects in animal studies, and is used to investigate the role of 5-HT1A receptors in modulating the release of dopamine and serotonin in the brain, and their involvement in addiction to abused stimulants such as cocaine and methamphetamine.

Pharmacodynamics
The target of Osemozotan is  5-HT1A receptors.  This molecules bind with almost 1000 times greater affinity to 5-HT1A receptors than most other 5-HT, dopamine, or adrenergic receptors. With repeated exposure of Osemozotan at the 5-HT1A receptors, there seems to be no change in the number of receptors, which is not typically seen with pharmaceutical agonists.

Pharmacokinetics
The pharmacokinetic data was collected from animal studies performed in mice and rats.  The CMax was obtained 15 minutes after oral ingestion of Osemozotan, the area under the curve was 2,943 ng x hr/mL and the half-life was 1.3 hours.  The pharmacokinetic testing has been able to help explain the longer acting pharmacologic effects of Osemozotan, and the increased potency.  Osemozotan was shown to have increased duration of pharmacologic effects compared to azapirones and requires a substantially lower dose to produce its pharmacologic effects.  This may be attractive to populations that will have to take this medication in that they may not have to take the medication as often throughout the day. In these studies there was a difference in dosage amount necessary for the indication it is used.  Osemozotan has not been found to be metabolized to 1-(2-pyrimidinyl)-piperazine, a common metabolite found with the azapirone class of medications. 1-(2-pyrimidinyl)-piperazine has affinity for receptors other than 5-HT1A, decreasing its specificity and increasing the risk of unwanted effects.  Since Osemozotan does not express this metabolite, it has greater specificity to 5-HT1A compared to other anxiolytic medications.

Uses
As mentioned above, Osemozotan is being investigated in its usage to treat pain, aggressive behavior, anxiety, depression, obsessive-compulsive disorder, and drug dependence with methamphetamine and cocaine.

Pain
It has been proposed that Osemozotan be used as an analgesic agent because of its activation of 5-HT  1A  receptors that lead to inhibitory serotonin signaling pathway within the spinal cord to cause hypoalgesia and decrease mechanical allodynia.

Aggressive behavior
Osemozotan was found to decrease the number of fighting incidences in mice similar to buspirone, diazepam, and tandospirone but required a lower pharmacologic dose to produce beneficial effects.   Osemozotan showed dose-dependent anti-aggressive effects and was not shown to decrease motor coordination within the mice.

Anxiety and depression
5-HT  1A  receptors when stimulated have shown to have anxiolytic and antidepressant pharmacologic effects.

Obsessive-Compulsive Disorder (OCD)
Obsessive-Compulsive patients have been found to have increased 5-HT levels within the brain.  With the use of Osemozotan as a 5-HT  1A  agonist, there will be a decrease in serotonergic activity within the brain, leading to possible anti-obsessional pharmacological action. One animal mouse model used to test for OCD is known as the marble burying test in which the amount of marbles buried within a certain time frame is recorded.  Mice performed the marble burying test both with and without Osemozotan.  With Osemozotan administration, the number of marbles buried was decreased with apparently little to no loss in motor coordination; these test results support the theory that Osemozotan may be useful in the treatment of OCD.

Drug dependence
It has been noted that sensitization of cocaine may stem from action of the 5-HT  1A  receptor.  While the role of 5-HT receptors with methamphetamine is still not certain, the use of osemozotan was found to decrease 5-HT levels in patients with repeated methamphetamine exposure; this may be a possibility for treatment of drug dependence with cocaine and methamphetamine.

Prevalence of mental disease states
About 18% of American adults suffer from some type of anxiety disorder  and 1 in 5 adults in the United States are on some type of medication to help control or improve their behavior.  The prevalence of prescription medication use for mental illnesses has noticeably increased in the past few years, with increasing numbers in the younger adults and in men. Around 60 billion dollars are spent annually for treatments dealing with mental illnesses.

See also 
 Piclozotan
 Robalzotan
 Sarizotan

References 

Benzodioxoles
Phenol ethers
Chromanes